Olenino is an urban locality (an urban-type settlement) and the administrative center of Oleninsky District of Tver Oblast, Russia, located  southwest of Tver on the federal "Baltic" highway (Moscow–Riga). Population:

History
Olenino was founded on October 22 (October 9 Old Style) 1898 as a settlement serving the railway station. At the time, it belonged to Rzhevsky Uyezd of Tver Governorate.

On 12 July 1929, governorates and uyezds were abolished, and Oleninsky District with the administrative center in the settlement of Olenino was established. It belonged to Rzhev Okrug of Western Oblast. On August 1, 1930 the okrugs were abolished, and the districts were subordinated directly to the oblast. On 29 January 1935 Kalinin Oblast was established, and Oleninsky District was transferred to Kalinin Oblast. During World War II, from October 10, 1941 to March 4, 1943, Olenino was occupied by German troops. On 13 February 1963, Oleninsky District was abolished and merged into Nelidovsky District; on 4 March 1964, it was reestablished. In 1990, Kalinin Oblast was renamed Tver Oblast.

Economy

Industry
There are enterprises of food and timber industries.

Transportation
The railway which connects Moscow and Riga via Rzhev, runs through Olenino. There is passenger railway traffic. Olenino is the biggest railway station in Oleninsky district.

The M9 highway connecting Moscow with Riga also passes Olenino. There are also local roads with bus traffic originating from Olenino.

Culture and recreation
There is a local museum in Olenino.

References

Notes

Sources

Urban-type settlements in Tver Oblast
Rzhevsky Uyezd